Magdalena District is a place name that may refer to:

Magdalena District, Chachapoyas, a district of the Province of Chachapoyas in Peru
Magdalena District, Maribor, a district of the city of Maribor, northeastern Slovenia